The Carpathian League was a multi-national ice hockey league held for the 1997-98 season featuring teams from the region of the Carpathian Mountains. Teams from Hungary, Poland, Croatia, Slovakia, and Serbia participated.

1997-98 season

First round
Group A

Group B

Final round
3rd place
  Ferencvárosi TC –  Alba Volán Székesfehérvár 6:1, 2:3

Final
  Dunaferr SE Dunaújváros –  SHK Danubia Bratislava 7:1, 6:4

External links
Season on hockeyarchives.info

  
Defunct multi-national ice hockey leagues in Europe
1
Ice hockey leagues in Croatia
Ice hockey leagues in Hungary
Ice hockey leagues in Poland
Ice hockey leagues in Serbia
Ice hockey leagues in Slovakia
1997 establishments in Europe
1998 disestablishments in Europe
Sports leagues established in 1997
Sports leagues disestablished in 1998